The  Omaha Beef season was the twelfth season as a professional indoor football franchise and third in the Indoor Football League (IFL). One of twenty-two teams competing in the IFL for the 2011 season, the Omaha, Nebraska-based Omaha Beef were members of the Great Lakes Division of the United Conference.

Schedule
Key:

Preseason

Regular season

Playoffs

Roster

Standings

References

Omaha Beef
Omaha Beef seasons
Omaha Beef